Restrepo is a town and municipality in the Meta Department, Colombia.

Climate
Restrepo has a tropical rainforest climate (Köppen Af) with very heavy rainfall year round and extremely heavy rainfall from April to October. Precipitation exceeds  in May and June. It is the wettest place in the department of Meta, and one of the wettest places in the world, receiving comparable rainfall to the more famously wet Chocó region on the opposite side of the Andes.

References

Municipalities of Meta Department